Don't Ever Leave Me is a 1949 British comedy film directed by Arthur Crabtree and starring Petula Clark, Jimmy Hanley, Hugh Sinclair, Edward Rigby, and Anthony Newley. Produced by Betty Box during her stint at Gainsborough Pictures, it was written by Robert Westerby.

Plot
The plot, a variation on The Ransom of Red Chief, revolves around Sheila Farlaine (Clark), the teenaged daughter of Shakespearean tragedian Michael Farlaine (Sinclair), who is kidnapped by elderly crook Harry Denton (Rigby) when it's suggested he no longer has what it takes to be a master criminal.

When Harry starts having second thoughts about the caper, Sheila - tired of playing second fiddle to her egotistical father's career - becomes the mastermind of the plot and resists every effort made by Harry's grandson Jack (Hanley) to return her home before things get serious. However, in this strange scenario Sheila wants to be kidnapped, as it gives her the opportunity to act grown up and she thinks her father will at last take some interest. He meanwhile embraces the role of worried parent for whom "the show must go on" and thrives on the newspaper publicity. Sheila begins to take a romantic interest in Jack, and despite her only being 15 (and three-quarters), she blackmails him into taking her out to clubs and casinos, wining, dining and dancing. Jack's girlfriend is less than happy when she discovers this.

Then Sheila's friend Jimmy (Newley) decides that he too wants to be "kidnapped" and becomes a general nuisance to one and all.

Production
Taking advantage of Clark's vocal abilities, screenwriter Westerby included two scenes in which she sang the tune "It's Not for the Want of Trying" by songwriters Jack Fishman and Peter Hart. The film, Clark's twelfth, allowed her to play a more mature role than in previous outings, and was both a critical and commercial success.

Anthony Steel has one of his earliest screen appearances.

Cast
 Jimmy Hanley as Jack Denton 
 Petula Clark as Sheila Farlaine 
 Linden Travers as Mary Lamont 
 Hugh Sinclair as Michael Farlaine 
 Edward Rigby as Harry Denton 
 Anthony Newley as Jimmy Knowles 
 Barbara Murray as Joan Robbins 
 Brenda Bruce as Miss Smith 
 Maurice Denham as Mr. Knowles 
 Frederick Piper as Max Marshall 
 Sandra Dorne as Ruby Baines 
 Russell Waters as Mr. Robbins 
 Anthony Steel as Harris 
 Michael Balfour as Jim Kennedy 
 James Hayter as Man with Summons 
 Dandy Nichols as Mrs. Marshall 
 Cyril Chamberlain as News Reporter 
 Philip Stainton as Detective Inspector 
 John Salew as Farlaine's Manager 
 Barbara Leake as Mrs. Brand 
 Arthur Hambling as Policeman at Jack's Flat 
 Martin Miller as Leon Stoltz
 Ben Williams as Superintendent in Cells

References

External links

1949 films
British comedy films
1949 comedy films
British black-and-white films
Films set in London
Films directed by Arthur Crabtree
Gainsborough Pictures films
Films produced by Betty Box
Films about child abduction
1940s British films